C. domesticus may refer to:

 Coprinellus domesticus, a mushroom species
 Culex domesticus, a mosquito species in the genus Culex

See also
 Domesticus (disambiguation)